Stephen Andrew Guppy (born 29 March 1969) is an English football coach and former professional footballer who now coaches at Nashville SC.

A winger, he started his senior career with Wycombe Wanderers in 1989, over a five-year period he made around 200 appearances for the club, helping Wycombe win promotion to the Football League. Earning a move to Newcastle United in 1994, later in the year he transferred to Port Vale. After three successful years at Vale he signed to Leicester City in 1997. After a four-year spell with the "Foxes" he moved to Scotland to play for Celtic. In 2004, he returned to Leicester, before brief spells with Leeds United, Stoke City, and another return to Wycombe. In 2005, he joined American club D.C. United, and after another year returned to the English non-league scene with Stevenage Borough. He then retired in 2008 following a spell back in the States with Rochester Rhinos.

As well as a successful nineteen-year club career, he earned England caps at under-21, semi-pro, 'B', and finally at full senior level.

Playing career

Club career
Guppy was spotted playing for his local team, Colden Common and offered a chance with Southampton in March 1989. He made a handful of appearances in the Saints reserves at the end of the 1988–89 season (but failed to break into the first team) before moving to Jim Kelman's Wycombe Wanderers in September 1989. He turned professional with Wycombe in 1992, at the age of 23. Prior to turning professional he worked on building sites.

At Wycombe, he first teamed up with newly appointed Martin O'Neill and helped take them into the Football League as Conference champions in 1992–93 as well as completing the non-league double by winning the FA Trophy. He was a virtual ever-present in Wycombe's debut 1993–94 season in the Football League at the end of which they secured promotion to Second Division via the play-offs.

In August 1994, he was signed by Kevin Keegan's Newcastle United for a fee of £150,000. He made one first team appearance as a substitute in the League Cup in Newcastle's 2–0 defeat of Manchester United. He subsequently moved on to Port Vale in November 1994 for £225,000. He later recalled seeing a local newspaper headline "Vale sign Premiership star' and I thought 'Great! Who else have they signed?’ but of course the headline was about me. I thought – but I’ve only played a handful of games in the Premiership I'm hardly a star!" Vale was a step down, but another top manager – in the form of John Rudge, helped him focus on being a first team performer again. He played in the 1996 Anglo-Italian Cup Final, as Vale lost 5–2 to Genoa. In nearly three seasons at the then First Division club he became a firm fan favourite and is now classed a club legend after his memorable performances on the left wing.

In February 1997 he was tracked down by his former boss Martin O'Neill, who paid £850,000 to take him to Premier League club Leicester City for the first time. He was cup-tied for their victory in the 1997 Football League Cup Final. It was in his first spell with the Foxes that he was most successful, playing in over 140 matches under O'Neill. He gained League Cup honours with Leicester City in 2000, having also reached the final in the previous season.

In August 2001, Guppy re-joined O'Neill at Celtic for £700,000, where he spent two-and-a-half years. During his time at Celtic, they won the Scottish Premier League in his first season at the club. The following season, 2002–03, Guppy had a number of injury problems, meaning he missed the 2003 UEFA Cup Final. In 2003-04 Guppy only made one appearance for Celtic, in a Scottish League Cup tie against Partick Thistle, before leaving Celtic to re-join Leicester City in January 2004. Guppy left Leicester in the summer of 2004, to try to get to the US to play. He then spent a brief spell at Leeds United in August 2004, scoring once against Nottingham Forest, before gaining a short-term deal at Stoke City followed by a short spell back at Wycombe, scoring once against Swansea City. He moved to the United States but his short stint in Major League Soccer with Washington-based D.C. United was ended prematurely due to injury, and he was released by the club after playing in just five league games in which he was featured in a starting line-up alongside Freddy Adu in midfield.

In August 2006 he signed for Stevenage Borough, scoring his first goal for them in a 1–1 draw at Exeter City. With Jeff Kenna, Guppy became the first player to play at both the new Wembley and the old Wembley. This was achieved on 12 May 2007 when Kidderminster Harriers played Borough in the 2007 final of the FA Trophy at the new Wembley Stadium. Borough won 3–2 despite being 2–0 down at half time; Craig Dobson, who replaced Guppy on 63 minutes, scored the equalizing goal. Due to Stevenage winning, Guppy became the first ever person to win medals at both the old and new Wembley Stadium.

In 2008, he headed for America again, signing with the Rochester Rhinos as Player and Assistant Coach. Guppy logged 1,520 minutes of playing time in 21 league matches, starting in most of his appearances. He tallied two assists, both of which came off of his trademark crosses from the left wing. Guppy's first goal for the Rhinos came off of a header on 26 September in the final 10 minutes of the first-round, first leg play-off tie against the Charleston Battery.

International career
It was whilst at Leicester that he gained his only England cap, playing against Belgium on 10 October 1999. Manager Kevin Keegan described him as "a little bit like a left-sided David Beckham". Guppy remains the only footballer to have played for England under-21, England semi-pro, England B and the full England teams.

Style of play
Port Vale player and lifelong fan Tom Pope described Guppy as "a very tricky winger, one who could go on the inside or the outside", and a player with good crossing ability. In May 2019, he was voted into the "Ultimate Port Vale XI" by members of the OneValeFan'' supporter website.

Coaching career
After a season as player-coach at Rochester, Guppy was recruited for the position of assistant coach to Gary Smith at Major League Soccer team Colorado Rapids. Having had one more year on his coaching contract with the Rochester Rhinos, Rochester released Guppy from his duties, allowing him to move onto a higher level of coaching. He was assistant coach at the Colorado Rapids for three years, from 2009 to 2012. During his time at the club the Rapids lifted the MLS Cup in 2010. He left the club when the Rapids parted company with Gary Smith in November 2011. In March 2012, Guppy reunited with his old boss Martin O'Neill at Sunderland to work as a part-time coach, giving extra specialised sessions on technical work to "Black Cats" young players. A few months later he settled into the role on a full-time basis.

In April 2013, Guppy followed O'Neill out of Sunderland as incoming manager Paolo Di Canio appointed his own coaching staff.
In 2014, he joined O'Neill's coaching staff to specifically coach the wingers and strikers of the Republic of Ireland national side. He helped former teammate Neil Aspin to coach Port Vale during 2018–19 pre-season. O'Neill was sacked by Ireland in November 2018 following relegation out of the UEFA Nations League B Group 3, and Guppy also lost his position. He went on to be reunited with Gary Smith at Nashville SC, where he worked as an assistant coach.

Club statistics
Club
Source:

International
Source:

HonoursWycombe WanderersFA Trophy: 1990–91, 1992–93
Football Conference: 1992–93
Football League Third Division play-offs: 1994Port ValeAnglo-Italian Cup runner-up: 1995–96Leicester CityLeague Cup: 1999–2000CelticScottish Premier League: 2001–02
Scottish Cup runner-up: 2001–02Stevenage BoroughFA Trophy: 2006–07Individual'''
PFA Third Division Team of the Year: 1993–94

References

1969 births
Sportspeople from Winchester
Footballers from Hampshire
Living people
English footballers
England under-21 international footballers
England B international footballers
England international footballers
England semi-pro international footballers
Association football wingers
Colden Common F.C. players
Southampton F.C. players
Wycombe Wanderers F.C. players
Celtic F.C. players
Newcastle United F.C. players
Port Vale F.C. players
Leicester City F.C. players
Leeds United F.C. players
Stoke City F.C. players
D.C. United players
Stevenage F.C. players
Rochester New York FC players
Premier League players
English Football League players
National League (English football) players
Scottish Premier League players
Major League Soccer players
USL First Division players
Expatriate soccer players in the United States
English expatriate sportspeople in the United States
English expatriate footballers
English football managers
Association football coaches
Colorado Rapids non-playing staff
Sunderland A.F.C. non-playing staff
Port Vale F.C. non-playing staff